Fiume Veneto (Standard Friulian: ;

Fiume Veneto borders the following municipalities: Azzano Decimo, Casarsa della Delizia, Chions, Pordenone, San Vito al Tagliamento, Zoppola.

People
 Federico Barbaro, missionary to Japan, translator and essayist

Twin towns
 Sirnitz, Austria, since 5 September 1993
 Hude, Germany, since 6 July 2002
 Castelsarrasin, France, since 22 September 2007

References

External links
 Official website

Cities and towns in Friuli-Venezia Giulia